From 2004 to 2019, there were eight European Parliament constituencies in France. Since the 2019 European Parliament election, there has been a single constituency covering the whole country.

The constituencies all used the party-list proportional representation with the highest average method from their creation to their abolition. French citizens living abroad were added to the Île-de-France constituency in 2014.

The table below shows the changes to France's European Parliament constituencies over time, listing the numbers of Members of the European Parliament each elected at each European Parliamentary election.

Notes

References